The 1811–1812 New Madrid earthquakes were a series of intense intraplate earthquakes beginning with an initial earthquake of moment magnitude 7.2–8.2 on December 16, 1811, followed by a moment magnitude 7.4 aftershock on the same day. Two additional earthquakes of similar magnitude followed in January and February 1812. They remain the most powerful earthquakes to hit the contiguous United States east of the Rocky Mountains in recorded history. The earthquakes, as well as the seismic zone of their occurrence, were named for the Mississippi River town of New Madrid, then part of the Louisiana Territory and now within the U.S. state of Missouri.

The epicenters of the earthquakes were located in an area that at the time was at the distant western edge of the American frontier, only sparsely settled by European settlers. The New Madrid earthquakes were interpreted variously by American Indian tribes, but one consensus was universally accepted: the powerful earthquake had to have meant something. For many tribes in Tecumseh's pan-Indian alliance, it meant that Tecumseh and his brother the Prophet must be supported.

The three earthquakes and their major aftershocks
 December 16, 1811, 8:15 UTC (2:15 am local time): M 7.2–8.2, epicenter in what is now northeast Arkansas. It caused only slight damage to man-made structures, mainly because of the sparse population in the epicentral area. The future location of Memphis, Tennessee, experienced level IX shaking on the Mercalli intensity scale. A seismic seiche propagated upriver, and Little Prairie (a village that was on the site of the former Fort San Fernando, near the site of present-day Caruthersville, Missouri) was heavily damaged by soil liquefaction. Modified Mercalli intensity VII or greater was observed over a  area.
 December 16, 1811 (aftershock), 14:15 UTC (8:15 am local time): M 7.4, epicenter in northeast Arkansas. This shock followed the first earthquake by six hours and was similar in intensity.
 January 23, 1812, 15:00 UTC (9:00 am local time): M 7.0–8.0, epicenter in the Missouri Bootheel. The meizoseismal area was characterized by general ground warping, ejections, fissuring, severe landslides, and caving of stream banks. Johnston and Schweig attributed this earthquake to a rupture on the New Madrid North Fault. This may have placed strain on the Reelfoot Fault.
 February 7, 1812, 9:45 UTC (3:45 am local time): M 7.4–8.6, epicenter near New Madrid, Missouri. The town of New Madrid was destroyed. In St. Louis, Missouri, many houses were severely damaged and their chimneys were toppled. This shock was definitively attributed to the Reelfoot Fault by Johnston and Schweig. Uplift along a segment of this reverse fault created temporary waterfalls on the Mississippi at Kentucky Bend, created waves that propagated upstream, and caused the formation of Reelfoot Lake by obstructing streams in what is now Lake County, Tennessee. The maximum Modified Mercalli intensity observed was XII.

The many more aftershocks include one magnitude 7 aftershock to the December 16, 1811, earthquake which occurred at 6:00 UTC (12:00 am local time) on December 17, 1811, and one magnitude 7 aftershock to the February 7, 1812, earthquake which occurred on the same day at 4:40 UTC (10:40 pm local time). Susan Hough, a seismologist of the United States Geological Survey (USGS), has estimated the earthquakes' magnitudes as around magnitude 7.

Eyewitness accounts
John Bradbury, a fellow of the Linnean Society, was on the Mississippi on the night of December 15, 1811, and describes the tremors in great detail in his Travels in the Interior of America in the Years 1809, 1810 and 1811, published in 1817:

Eliza Bryan in New Madrid, Territory of Missouri, wrote the following eyewitness account in March 1812:

John Reynolds (1788–1865), the fourth governor of Illinois, among other political posts, mentions the earthquake in his biography My Own Times: Embracing Also the History of My Life (1855):

The Shaker diarist Samuel Swan McClelland described the effects of the earthquake on the Shaker settlement at West Union (Busro), Indiana, where the earthquakes contributed to the temporary abandonment of the westernmost Shaker community.

Geologic setting

The underlying cause of the earthquakes is not well understood, but modern faulting seems to be related to an ancient geologic feature buried under the Mississippi River alluvial plain, known as the Reelfoot Rift. The New Madrid Seismic Zone (NMSZ) is made up of reactivated faults that formed when what is now North America began to split or rift apart during the breakup of the supercontinent Rodinia in the Neoproterozoic era (about 750 million years ago). Faults were created along the rift and igneous rocks formed from magma that was being pushed towards the surface. The resulting rift system failed, but has remained as an aulacogen (a scar or zone of weakness) deep underground.

In recent decades, minor earthquakes have continued. The epicenters of over 4,000 earthquakes can be identified from seismic measurements taken since 1974. They originate from the seismic activity of the Reelfoot Rift. The zone, colored red on the map, is called the New Madrid Seismic Zone. New forecasts estimate a 7 to 10 percent chance, in the next 50 years, of a repeat of a major earthquake like those that occurred in 1811–1812, which likely had magnitudes  between 7.6 and 8.0. A 25 to 40% chance exists, in a 50-year time span, of a magnitude 6.0 or greater earthquake.

In a report filed in November 2008, the U.S. Federal Emergency Management Agency warned that a serious earthquake in the New Madrid Seismic Zone could result in "the highest economic losses due to a natural disaster in the United States", further predicting "widespread and catastrophic" damage across Alabama, Arkansas, Illinois, Indiana, Kentucky, Mississippi, Missouri, and particularly Tennessee, where a 7.7 magnitude quake or greater would cause damage to tens of thousands of structures affecting water distribution, transportation systems, and other vital infrastructure.

Aftermath
The quakes caused extensive changes to the region's topography. Subsidence, uplift, fissures, landslides and riverbank collapses were common. Trees were uprooted by the intense shaking; others were drowned when subsided land was flooded. Reelfoot Lake was formed in Tennessee by subsidence ranging from 1.5 meters, up to 6 meters in some places. Lake St. Francis, in eastern Arkansas, was expanded by subsidence, with sand and coal being ejected from fissures in the adjacent swamps as water levels rose by 8 to 9 meters. Waves from the Mississippi River caused boats to wash ashore; river banks rose, sand bars were destroyed, and some islands completely disappeared. Sand blows also occurred in Missouri, Tennessee, and Arkansas, destroying farmland. 

Due to the nature of the underlying rock mass, which contains few fractures or faults, the seismic waves generated from the earthquakes were able to travel great distances without being interrupted. Persons as far away as Canada felt the ground shaking. Intense effects were widely felt in Illinois, Arkansas, Tennessee, Kentucky and Missouri. 

The number of people who died as a result of the earthquake is unknown; the frontier setting meant that the region was sparsely populated and communications and records were poor. Predominantly wood construction meant that few people died from falling buildings, though the intense shaking caused many chimneys to fall, wood structures to crack, and damage from falling trees, particularly in the epicentral area during the first earthquake on December 16, 1811. 

Rated at VII on the Mercalli Intensity Scale, the New Madrid earthquakes remain the strongest recorded earthquakes east of the Rocky Mountains. The Reelfoot Rift, a 500 million year old rift zone identified as the primary driver of the quakes, remains poorly understood;  however, geologists estimate the risk of another earthquake as great as the New Madrid Earthquake within the next 50 years is 7 to 10 percent. While the risk of a smaller magnitude earthquake to occur in this location in the next 50 years is about 25 to 40 percent. As a result of these findings, highways, buildings, skyscrapers, and bridges were all reevaluated.

Gallery

See also

 List of earthquakes in the United States

References

Further reading
 Jay Feldman. When the Mississippi Ran Backwards : Empire, Intrigue, Murder, and the New Madrid Earthquakes Free Press, 2005. 
 Conevery Bolton Valencius, The Lost History of the New Madrid Earthquakes The University of Chicago Press, 2013.  
 Conevery Bolton Valencius, “Accounts of the New Madrid earthquakes: personal narratives and seismology over the last two centuries,” in Deborah R. Coen, ed., "Witness to Disaster: Earthquakes and Expertise in Comparative Perspective," *Science in Context*, 25, no. 1 (February 2012): 17-48.

External links
 The Enigma of the New Madrid Earthquakes of 1811–1812. Johnson, A.C. and Schweig, E.S. (1996)  Annual Review of Earth and Planetary Sciences, Volume 24, pp. 339–384. SAO/NASA Astrophysics Data System (ADS)
 The Introduction to The Lost History of the New Madrid Earthquakes by Conevery Bolton Valencius.
 The New Madrid Fault Zone (NMFZ)  (links to maps, history, predictions, etc. from the Arkansas Center for Earthquake Education)
 Steamboat Adventure: The New Madrid Earthquakes (dozens of contemporary accounts of the earthquake, provided by Hanover College)
USGS, Summary of 1811-1812 New Madrid Earthquake Sequence, at https://www.usgs.gov/natural-hazards/earthquake-hazards/science/summary-1811-1812-new-madrid-earthquakes-sequence?qt-science_center_objects=0#qt-science_center_objects
  The "Hard Shock:" The New Madrid Earthquakes. The History Guy

1811 earthquakes
1812 earthquakes
1811-12 New Madrid
1811-12 New Madrid
1811-12 New Madrid
1811-12 New Madrid
1811-12 New Madrid
1811-12 New Madrid
December 1811 events
January 1812 events
February 1812 events
1812 in Missouri Territory